The Star Awards for Best Actress is an award presented annually at the Star Awards, a ceremony that was established in 1994.

The category was introduced in 1995, at the 2nd Star Awards ceremony; Fann Wong received the award for her role in Chronicle of Life and it is given in honour of a Mediacorp actress who has delivered an outstanding performance in a leading role. The nominees are determined by a team of judges employed by Mediacorp; winners are selected by a majority vote from the entire judging panel.

Since its inception, the award has been given to 13 actresses. Huang Biren is the most recent winner in this category for her role in Recipe of Life. Since the ceremony held in 2022, Huang and Zoe Tay remain as the only actresses to win in this category four times, surpassing Chen Liping and Ivy Lee who have three wins each. Tay has also been nominated on 15 occasions, more than any other actress. Jeanette Aw holds the record for the most nominations without a win, with six (she eventually won her first award in 2016). Jesseca Liu and Jacelyn Tay are currently the actresses who have the most nominations without a win, with five.

Recipients

Nominees distribution chart

Award records

Multiple awards and nominations

The following individuals received two or more Best Actress awards:

The following individuals received two or more Best Actress nominations:

References

External links 

Star Awards